Lybrant G. Robinson (born August 31, 1964) is a former American football defensive end in the National Football League (NFL) for the Washington Redskins.  He played college football at Delaware State University and was drafted in the fifth round of the 1989 NFL Draft. Robinson later became a starter in the CFL with the Ottawa Rough Riders (1991–94) and the Saskatchewan Roughriders (1994–97).

1964 births
Living people
People from Salisbury, Maryland
American football defensive ends
Delaware State Hornets football players
Washington Redskins players
Ottawa Rough Riders players
Saskatchewan Roughriders players